Hoodlum Priest may refer to:
 Hoodlum Priest (film), a 1961 film by Irvin Kershner
 Hoodlum Priest (musician), a name used by producer/multi instrumentalist and composer Derek Thompson
 Hoodlum Priest (album), the 3rd album by the musician